The Adams Avenue Parkway is a  road that is almost entirely within Washington Terrace, Utah, United States, that connects Interstate 84 (I‑84) with U.S. Route 89 (US‑89/Washington Boulevard). Approximately  of the southern end of the road is also a private toll road. The southern (toll) section opened in 2001 at a cost of $8.9 million (equivalent to $ million in ) and was created after decades of requests by locals to connect the existing 500 East (Adams Avenue) to I‑84. The toll section allowed commuters to bypass the rest of US‑89 through southern Weber County to I‑84.

Route description
The parkway begins at the Adams Avenue interchange on I‑84 (Exit 85) in South Weber in Davis County. (The diamond interchange, which existed prior to the construction of the southern end of the parkway, also provide a connection south to 475 East in South Weber.) On the north side of the interchange is an intersection to the west end of Cottonwood Drive, which continues easterly to Uintah. North of Cottonwood Drive the road widens to five lanes, begins the privately owned toll section, and crosses over the Weber River. (The river forms the border between South Weber and Washington Terrace, as well as between Davis and Weber counties.)

Just north of the river the parkway crosses over the Union Pacific Railroad's Evanston Subdivision tracks, before climbing the north river bank.

After one intersection with 5900 South, which presently serves only the toll road company's headquarters, a single commercial building, private maintenance gives way to a four-lane city street with sidewalks just shy of 5800 South. The roadway continues northeasterly to the top of the hill near 5600 South, where pre-existing Adams Avenue (500 East) heads north, passing the Ogden Regional Medical Center to an intersection with Washington Boulevard (US-89) on the Washington Terrace-South Ogden border. Adams Avenue continues through South Ogden and into Ogden as a minor street one block east of US-89, with a gap near 4600 South and more north of downtown Ogden. In 2006 approximately 1,400 cars traveled the parkway on an average weekday.

Tolls
Tolls are collected in cash or via an ExpressCard account, a prepaid system that offers a discount for a $10 deposit to the account. The current toll is $2 in each direction for most vehicles and $1.00 additional if pulling a trailer.  Extra large vehicles are $1 per axle. Previously emergency vehicles (ambulances) were not charged a toll, however beginning July 3, 2003, they must pay the standard $2 toll. To allow quick passage through the toll barrier, these vehicles pay through a charge account. The Utah Department of Transportation worked out an agreement during local road construction for four days in 2003 to allow commuters to use the parkway free of charge.

History
The parkway was opened in 2001 after just under a year of construction. Local residents led by Doug and Bruce Stephens urged the state to connect I-84 directly to Adams Avenue, bypassing the congested US-89. Then-governor Mike Leavitt suggested that a private company rather than the state would need to build the road.

The roadway cost $8.9 million (equivalent to $ million in ) to build, of which the state provided $2 million (equivalent to $ million in ). Additional funds came from taxes levied on property owners along the parkway. The entire stretch of road between Washington Boulevard and I-84 was constructed or rebuilt by the Adams Avenue Turnpike LLC; however, they returned most of the road to local authorities. The only portion retained was a  segment between about 5800 South and I-84.

The roadway is defined under Weber County Ordinance, Title 31, which grants a franchise to Adams Avenue Turnpike LLC for an initial term of 50 years (expiring in 2051).

Intersections

See also

 List of toll roads in the United States

Notes

References

External links

 

2001 establishments in Utah
Non-freeway toll roads
Toll roads in Utah
Transportation in Davis County, Utah
Transportation in Weber County, Utah
Streets in Utah